Nang Lang Kham (born 1 June 1988) is a Burmese businesswoman and philanthropist. She is a Deputy CEO of Kanbawza Bank, and the executive director of the Kanbawza Group, a major business conglomerate founded by her father, Aung Ko Win. Nang is also known for her philanthropic work as the co-founder and chair of the Brighter Future Myanmar Foundation, one of the biggest contributors to social and community development in Myanmar which supports heath, education, poverty reduction and youth empowerment.

She was named one of the Women to Watch by Forbes Asia, and Inspiring Women of Burma, Champions for Change and Newsmakers of the Year 2016 by The Irrawaddy.

Early life and education
Nang Lang Kham was born on 1 June 1988 in Taunggyi, Shan State, Myanmar to parents Aung Ko Win, a business tycoon and Nang Than Htwe. At the age of 14, she moved to Singapore to study in a boarding school. She holds a Master's Degree in Management from University of Sydney and Bachelor's Degree in Business Administration from National University of Singapore.

Career
In 2008, she went to areas hit by Cyclone Nargis to support cyclone victims. Visiting the camps and meeting the people that lost their homes and families has motivated her and her sister, Nang Kham Noung, to establish the foundation – Brighter Future Myanmar (BFM), the social initiative arm of the KBZ Group. 

Nang started her business career in 2011, as part of the founding team of Air KBZ, obtaining a Diploma in Airline Management from IATA in Singapore and later being appointed Executive Director of Aviation and Financial Businesses. She also created jobs in Kanbawza Bank for differently-abled persons. She organized free medical treatment for children with cleft lips and cleft palate, and she conducted gender education for bank staff.

In March 2016, she was an invited speaker at the Most Powerful Women Asia Summit in Hong Kong, hosted by Fortune. 

In 2017, Nang was promoted to Deputy CEO of the bank. She has been selected to participate in the Huawei Future Shapers Project. She became a member of the Executive Committee of Myanmar Young Entrepreneurs Association.

Awards
In 2015, Nang has been awarded the State Excellence Award by the President of Myanmar in 2015.  

In 2016, she won the Euromoney Achievement Award for CSR 2015, Job Creation for Differently-abled Persons Award presented by the Social Welfare Relief and Resettlement Awards, and Woman of Excellence Award presented by the Taunggyi Association (Yangon). She was also recognised by Forbes Magazine as Asia's Woman To Watch 2016.

In 2017, she has been awarded the Promising Young Banker Award presented by The Asian Banker, which recognises top bankers in Asia under the age of 40. She won the Luhmu Htoochon (Social Commitment Award) (First Stage) presented by Shan State Government on the 70th anniversary of the Shan State Day, February 7, 2017.

In 2018, she received the Eminent Business Alumni Award 2018 from the National University of Singapore.

References

Living people
1988 births
Burmese businesspeople